Kyle Curinga (born December 30, 1993) is an American professional soccer player who plays as a defender for KPV.

Career

College
Curinga played college soccer as a midfielder at Florida Atlantic University for a single season in 2012.

Professional
Curinga moved to Finland, originally with GBK, and spent the 2016 season with FF Jaro. He moved back to the United States in 2017, signing with United Soccer League side Real Monarchs in March. Curinga was released by the Monarchs at the end of the 2017 season.

On January 9, 2018, Curinga was signed by his hometown team, the Tampa Bay Rowdies. Curinga had trialed with the Rowdies in early 2017, starting in the team's first preseason match of the year against VfL Wolfsburg as part of the 2017 Florida Cup.

On 30 January 2019, Curinga joined USL Championship expansion club Hartford Athletic.

Ahead of the 2020 season, Curinga joined Finnish team KPV. He scored his first goal in a 2020 Finnish Cup group stage match vs. FF Jaro on February 8, 2020.

References

External links
 

1993 births
Living people
American soccer players
Association football defenders
Florida Atlantic Owls men's soccer players
FF Jaro players
Real Monarchs players
Soccer players from Florida
Sportspeople from Clearwater, Florida
Ykkönen players
American expatriate soccer players
American expatriate sportspeople in Finland
Expatriate footballers in Finland
Tampa Bay Rowdies players
Hartford Athletic players
USL Championship players
Kokkolan Palloveikot players